Audrius is a Lithuanian masculine given name, derived from the Lithuanian word audra, which means "storm". The female variant is Audronė. The name may refer to:

Audrius Beinorius (born 1964), Lithuanian philosopher
Audrius Butkevičius (born 1960), Lithuanian politician 
Audrius Dzikaras (born 1957), Lithuanian painter 
Audrius Kšanavičius (born 1977), Lithuanian footballer
Audrius Nakas (born 1967), Lithuanian politician 
Audrius Raizgys (born 1969), Lithuanian triple jumper
Audrius Rubežius (born 1966), Lithuanian singer
Audrius Rudys (born 1951), Lithuanian politician
Audrius Šlekys (1975–2003), Lithuanian footballer
Audrius Stonys (born 1966), Lithuanian filmmaker
Audrius Žuta (born 1969), Lithuanian footballer

References

Lithuanian masculine given names